Nikles is a surname. Notable people with this surname include:

 Christian Nikles (born 1997), Bruneian swimmer
 Hans Nikles, Swiss football player
 Johan Nikles (born 1997), Swiss tennis player

See also
 Niklas (name)